The End of Course Test (EOCT, EOC, or EOC Test) is an academic assessment conducted in many states by the State Board of Education. Georgia, for example, tests from the ninth to twelfth grades, and North Carolina tests for any of the four core class subjects (math, science, social studies, and English).

North Carolina schools administer an EOCT in English II, Math I (Algebra I), Biology and Math 3 (Integrated Mathematics).  The official purpose of the test is to assess both individual and group knowledge and skills.  EOCTs are mandatory and require a minimum score for graduation eligibility. Additionally, a North Carolina student's EOCT score must account for at least 25% of the student's final grade in the relevant course.

Georgia high schools are required to administer a standardized, multiple-choice EOCT, in each of eight core subjects including Algebra I, U.S. History, Biology, Physical Science (8th-grade only--students in 11th grade do not take the EOC anymore), and American Literature and Composition.  The official purpose of the tests is to assess "specific content knowledge and skills."  Although a minimum test score is not required for the student to receive credit in the course or to graduate from high school, completion of the test is mandatory.  The EOCT score comprises 20% of a student's grade in the course.  Since the EOCT is an official, state-administered test, any violation or interference can result in the invalidation of scores of all students taking the exam on that subject. Interferences can include cellphones, mp3 players, reading books on the same subject as the exam, and talking.

Also, E.O.C. tests can be taken in middle schools. For example, in the state of Florida, it is mandatory for 7th graders (middle school) to take a Civics E.O.C. Test. A student can pass only if they attain a level of 3, 4 or 5.

References

Educational assessment and evaluation